Polynemicola is a genus of monegenean. As all Monogenea, species of Polynemicola are ectoparasites that affect their host by attaching themselves as larvae on the gills of the fish and grow into adult stage. This larval stage is called oncomiracidium, and is characterized as free swimming and ciliated.

Description
Members of the genus Polynemicola are characterised by a haptor nearly as long as, and distinct from, body; an eversible spiny cirrus; an unarmed genital atrium usually with a muscular sphincter-like rim and receptaculum seminis often well developed near the distal end of vagina.

Species
Currently 14 species are recognized:

References

Microcotylidae
Monogenea genera